"Wir haben noch das ganze Leben" is a song performed by Austrian singer-songwriter and radio presenter Julian Le Play. The song was released as a digital download in November 2014 as the fourth and final single from his second studio album Melodrom (2014). The song has peaked at number 35 on the Austrian Singles Chart.

Music video
A music video to accompany the release of "Wir haben noch das ganze Leben" was first released onto YouTube on 21 January 2015 at a total length of five minutes and eighteen seconds.

Track listing

Chart performance

Release history

References

2014 songs
2014 singles
Julian Le Play songs